The Western Illinois Leathernecks baseball team is the varsity intercollegiate baseball program of Western Illinois University in Macomb, Illinois, United States. The program's first season was in 1948, and it has been a member of the NCAA Division I Summit League since the start of the 1985 season. Its home venue is Alfred D. Boyer Stadium, located on Western Illinois's campus. Tayler Sheriff is the team's interim head coach starting in the 2023 season. The program has appeared in 0 NCAA Tournaments at the Division I level. It has won zero conference tournament championships and 0 regular season conference titles. As of the start of the 2018 Major League Baseball season, 3 former Leathernecks have appeared in Major League Baseball.

History

Early history
The program's first season of play was 1948. On September 19, 2019, Andy Pascoe was named the seventh head coach in Leathernecks history.

Conference affiliations
 Interstate Intercollegiate Athletic Conference (1948–1970)
 Independent (1971–1984)
 Summit League (1985–present)

Alfred D. Boyer Stadium

The stadium opened on May 6, 2006, and has a seating capacity of 500.  The stadium is named for Alfred D. Boyer, Western Illinois Class of 1972, whose $150,000 donation allowed the facility to be built.  The venue features a press box, chairback seating, a Daktronics scoreboard, and 60-foot-long dugouts.

Head coaches
Western Illinois's longest tenured head coach was Dick Pawlow, who has coached the team from 1970 to 1998, winning 545 games.

Notable former players
Below is a list of notable former Leathernecks and the seasons in which they played for Western Illinois.

 Paul Reuschel (1965–1968)
 Rick Reuschel (1967–1970)
 Rick Short (1993–1994)

See also
 List of NCAA Division I baseball programs

References

External links